Center Parcs may refer to:

 Center Parcs UK and Ireland, a short-break holiday company based in the United Kingdom and Ireland
 Center Parcs Europe, a short-break holiday company based in continental Europe